The Icaro Laminar is a large family of Italian high-wing, single-place and two-place hang gliders, designed and produced by Icaro 2000.

Design and development
The Laminar family of hang gliders was introduced in 1994 and has undergone continuous product improvement, keeping the line at the top of world competition.

The aircraft is made from aluminum and carbon fibre tubing, with the wing covered in Dacron sailcloth. Some models use Mylar sail components. The competition Laminars are "topless" designs with no kingpost or upper rigging. The MastR model was introduced for pilots who wanted the Laminar wing with a kingpost.

Operational history
The Laminar series has won many World Hang Gliding Championships, including the 2011 contest held at Monte Cucco, Italy, when first and second places went to Alex Ploner and Christian Ciech flying Laminar Z9 models.

Variants
Laminar 12 MR 700
Small sized model for lighter pilots, produced circa 2003 and no longer in production. Its  span wing is a "topless" design without a kingpost. DHV certified.
Laminar 13 MR 700
Medium sized model for mid-weight pilots, produced circa 2003 and no longer in production. Its  span wing is a "topless" design without a kingpost. DHV certified.
Laminar 14 MR 700
Large sized model for heavier pilots, produced circa 2003 and no longer in production. Its  span wing is a "topless" design without a kingpost. DHV certified.
Laminar Easy 14
Small sized model for lighter pilots, produced circa 2003 and no longer in production. Its  span wing is cable braced from a single kingpost. DHV certified.
Laminar Easy 16
Large sized model for heavier pilots, produced circa 2003 and no longer in production. Its  span wing is cable braced from a single kingpost. DHV certified.
Laminar Biplace
Two-place model for flight training and tourist flying, produced circa 2003 and no longer in production. Its  span wing is cable braced from a single kingpost. DHV certified.
Laminar MastR 12
Small sized model for lighter pilots, produced circa 2003 and no longer in production. Its  span wing is cable braced from a single kingpost. DHV certified as Class 2-3.
Laminar MastR 13
Medium sized model for mid-weight pilots, produced circa 2003 and no longer in production. Its  span wing is cable braced from a single kingpost. DHV and SHV certified as Class 2-3.
Laminar MastR 14
Large sized model for heavier pilots, produced circa 2003 and no longer in production. Its  span wing is cable braced from a single kingpost. DHV and SHV certified as Class 3.
Laminar Z9 12.6
Introduced in 2010, extra small sized model for small pilots. Its  span wing is a "topless" design without a kingpost. DHV certified as Class 3.
Laminar Z9 13.2
Introduced in 2010, small sized model for light pilots. Its  span wing is a "topless" design without a kingpost. DHV certified as Class 3.
Laminar Z9 13.7
Introduced in 2010, medium sized model for mid-weight pilots. Its  span wing  is a "topless" design without a kingpost. DHV certified as Class 3.
Laminar Z9 14.1
Introduced in 2010, large small sized model for heavier pilots. Its  span wing is a "topless" design without a kingpost. DHV certified as Class 3.
Laminar Z9 14.8
Introduced in 2010, extra large sized model for very heavy pilots. Its  span wing is a "topless" design without a kingpost. DHV certified as Class 3.
MastR S
Small sized model for light pilots. Its  span wing is cable braced from a single kingpost. DHV certified as Class 3.
MastR M
Medium sized model for mid-weight pilots. Its  span wing is cable braced from a single kingpost. DHV certified as Class 3.
MastR L
Large sized model for heavy pilots. Its  span wing is cable braced from a single kingpost. DHV certified as Class 3.

Applications
Icaro Pit-Trike

Specifications (Laminar Z9 14.1)

References

External links

Laminar
Hang gliders